Esiri is a name predominantly used by the Urhobo people of the Niger-Delta region of Nigeria. It can either be a forename or surname. You also have it in compound names e.g. Esiri-Okotete. Notable people with the surname include:

Allie Byrne Esiri (born 1967), English actress and writer
Justus Esiri (1942–2013), Nigerian actor
Sidney Onoriode Esiri (born 1980), better known as Dr SID, Nigerian singer-songwriter